The 1934 Twickenham by-election was a parliamentary by-election held on 22 June 1934 for the British House of Commons constituency of Twickenham in Middlesex.

The seat had become vacant when the constituency's Conservative Member of Parliament (MP), Hylton Murray-Philipson, died on 24 May 1934, aged 31. He had held the seat since a by-election in 1932.

The result was a victory for the Conservative candidate Alfred Critchley, who had stood for the Empire Free Trade Crusade and the United Empire Party in the 1931 Islington East by-election and as a Conservative at the 1929 general election.

Results

See also
 Twickenham constituency
 Twickenham
 1929 Twickenham by-election
 1932 Twickenham by-election
 1955 Twickenham by-election
 Lists of United Kingdom by-elections

References
 
 

Elections in the London Borough of Richmond upon Thames
By-elections to the Parliament of the United Kingdom in London constituencies
Twickenham
1934 elections in the United Kingdom
1934 in England
20th century in Middlesex
June 1934 events